Leucanopsis tabernilla is a moth of the family Erebidae. It was described by William Schaus in 1933. It is found in Panama and Ecuador.

References

tabernilla
Moths described in 1933